The Fifth Army of the Ottoman Empire or Turkish Fifth Army was formed on March 24, 1915, and dissolved on November 21, 1918. It was assigned the responsibility of defending the Dardanelles straits in World War I. The original commander of the army was the German military advisor to the Ottoman Empire, General Otto Liman von Sanders. The command passed to Vehip Pasha who became responsible for the Helles front while von Sanders still wielded considerable influence.

Order of Battle, April 1915 
In late April 1915, the army was structured as follows:

 III Corps (commanded by Esat Pasha)
 7th Division, 9th Division, 19th Division (commanded by Mustafa Kemal Atatürk)
 XV Corps (commanded by Colonel Hans Kannengiesser)
 3rd Division, 11th Division
 Dardanelles Fortified Area Command
 One aircraft squadron

When the Allied campaign the Battle of Gallipoli, which aimed to seize the Dardanelles, commenced, the Fifth Army comprised two army Corps; the III Corps was defending the Gallipoli peninsula and the XV Corps was defending the Asian shore.  The XV. Corps, also known as the "Asian Group." In addition, the 5th Division was positioned north of the peninsula under the command of First Army.

World War I

Order of Battle, Late Summer 1915 

The number of divisions involved in the defence of the peninsula expanded to ten and an unattached infantry regiment and a brigade of cavalry before the August Offensive. In late Summer 1915, the army was structured as follows:

 I Corps
 2nd Division, 3rd Division
 II Corps
 4th Division, 5th Division, 6th Division
 III Corps
 7th Division, 8th Division, 9th Division, 19th Division
 IV Corps
 10th Division, 11th Division, 12th Division
 V Corps
 13th Division, 14th Division, 15th Division
 Dardanelles Fortified Area Command
 One aircraft squadron

A further three divisions arranged in the "Asian Group." The four divisions at Anzac made up the III Corps. (6 at Helles, 4 at Anzac) plus additional.

Order of Battle, August 1916 
In August 1916, the army was structured as follows:

 I Corps
 14th Division, 16th Division
 Dardanelles Fortified Area Command

Order of Battle, December 1916 
In December 1916, the army was structured as follows:

 XIV Corps
 57th Division, 59th Division
 Dardanelles Fortified Area Command

Order of Battle, August 1917, January 1918 
In August 1917, January 1918, the army was structured as follows:

 XIV Corps
 57th Division
 XIX Corps
 59th Division
 XXI Corps
 49th Division
 Dardanelles Fortified Area Command

Order of Battle, June, September 1918 
In June, September 1918, the army was structured as follows:

 XIV Corps
 57th Division
 XIX Corps
 None
 XXI Corps
 49th Division
 Dardanelles Fortified Area Command

After Mudros

Order of Battle, November 1918 
In November 1918, the army was structured as follows:

 I Corps
 55th Division
 XIV Corps
 49th Division, 60th Division, 61st Division

Sources

External links
Turkish Army at Gallipoli

Field armies of the Ottoman Empire
Military units and formations of the Ottoman Empire in World War I